Thomas Berwick (1825–1891) was a British convict transported to Western Australia.

Thomas Berwick may also refer to:

Thomas Berwick (MP) for Shrewsbury in 1399
Thomas Noel Hill, 2nd Baron Berwick
Tom Berwick, see 2011–12 Coventry City F.C. season

See also
Thomas Bewick (1753–1828) English engraver and natural history author